Percy Venner Bradshaw (27 November 1877 – 13 October 1965), who often signed PVB, was a British illustrator who also created the Press Art School, a correspondence course for drawing.

Biography
Percy Bradshaw was born in Hackney, part of London, on 27 November 1877, the son of William Bradshaw, a warehouseman, and his wife Frances Ann. He was baptised in Dover on 27 January 1878. He attended Newport Road School in Leyton where he reached fourth class. He then attended Ivydale Road School from 12 March 1888 to 30 March 1889, moving to Haberdashers' Aske' Boys School at Hatcham. He dropped out of Aske's when he was 14 years old and started working at an advertising agency. Meanwhile, he followed evening courses in art at Goldsmiths College and Birkbeck College.

Bradshaw had his first drawing published in The Boy's Own Paper when he was 15 years old, and moved to the art department of the advertising agency. Three years later he became a full time cartoonist, with his work also appearing in magazines like Bystander (magazine), Home Chat, Sunday Companion, Tatler, The Sketch and The Windsor Magazine. He also worked for a while for the Daily Mail. Bradshaw so closely resembled the Prime Minister, Asquith, that people would doff their hats to him when he went for walks in the park.

Bradshaw married Mabel Alice Bennett (6 January 188117 February 1966)
, the daughter of the late Edmund Hellyer Bennett (18411883) and Mary Anne Gardner (18411904), at St Peter's Church in Brockley, Lewisham on 27 July 1910. The wedding was choral, and 160 guests attended the reception at St. Peter's Hall. Among the wedding gifts was a grand piano (from the bride's sister). The couple left for a honeymoon in Switzerland. By 1911 the census shows the newly-weds living at 37 Dacres Road, Forest Hill, London, where they were to remain their entire lives.

The couple had one child, Denise M.

The Press Art School
He also wrote articles on drawing, appearing in the Daily Graphic and in The Boy's Own Paper, where his series Black and White Drawing as a Profession was so successful that he decided to create his own art correspondence course, the Press Art School, in 1905. He remained principal of the school for more than 50 years, first from his home, later from Tudor Hall in Forest Hill, London.

The school was quite well regarded. Not the least of the advantages that Bradshaw's school offered was that Bradshaw not only offered training, but also introduced the work of his pupils to those editors he considered most likely to use of the sketches.{{refn|group=note|Pearson's Weekly considered that these introductions alone were worth the small cost of the courses.}} Thus Bradshaw helped Leo Cheyney to sell drawings to The Boys' Own Paper, Bystander and other publications.

Bradshaw though that the outbreak of the First World War doomed his school, but clever advertising turned the War to his advantage, swelling the ranks of his students. He enrolled over 1,100 new pupils by the end of 1914, over 1,500 in 1915, and averaged over 3,000 enrollments a year for the 1916–1918. By 1918 he had 22 full-time assistants and the GPO needed a special van to deliver his mail. Bradshaw once remarked that The only difficulty I had was keeping going between wars.Later life
During the First World War, Bradshaw was a special constable; during the second, he worked as a firewatcher. After the first war, he created hundreds of illustrated postcards for specialized companies like Raphael Tuck & Sons, worked again for an advertising agency, and for Sun Enravings from Watford. During the Second World War, he wrote articles about cartoonists for the London Opinion, and published humorous poetry.

Bradshaw was a member of the London Sketch Club and in 1958 wrote the history of the Savage Club where he was a committee member. He died in on 13 October 1965 at Hither Green Hospital, Lewisham in London. His estate was valued at £25,000. Mabel Alice survived him by less than six months, dying at Levisham Hospital, London on 17 February 1966. Her estate was valued at £26,543.

The Art of the IllustratorThe Art of the Illustrator was probably Bradshaw's most important work. It consisted of a series of portfolios based on twenty leading illustrators. Bradshaw commissioned each of them for a special illustration. Each artist was free to choose the subject, so long as the illustration was representative of the artist's normal technique and that five preliminary stages in its composition should be shown.  It is not absolutely clear when the portfolios were published. The Jisc catalogue shows them being issued from 1900 to 1920. However, notices from the press show them as just issued in June 1917.. The Graphic noted that twelve of the portfolios had already been published by mid-June 1917. Therefore, the dates should probably be 1917–1918. Some of the illustrations are dated 1915 and one may even be dated 1914. This makes sense as some illustrators were bound to take longer to complete their commissions and it took Bradshaw, who was dealing with a huge surge in enrolments, time to write the descriptions.

The portfolios were not cheap, for what they were: a set of six plates and less than thirty pages of text. A review in The Connoisseur: An Illustrated Magazine for Collectors in August 1918 gives the cost of the set of twenty portfolios as £7. 7s. (seven guineas) or £8. 8s. (eight guineas) if purchased in monthly instalments. A single portfolio on its own cost 10s 6d. (half a guinea).

Each of the twenty portfolios dealt with the personality and working methods of a leading illustrator with:
 a biography of the illustrator
 an illustration or photograph of the illustrator at work in their studio
 an explanation by the illustrator describing what they have done in each stage of the preparation of the illustration
 a plate showing an illustration typical of their work
 five other plates showing the work at five earlier stages of its production, from the first pencil rough to the just before the finished drawing or colour sketch. 
Six of the illustrators worked in watercolour, five in pen and ink, two in wash-painting, and one in body-colour. The subjects of the portfolios, and they were:
Henry Mayo Bateman (18871970)
Charles Edmund Brock (18701938)
Cyrus Cuneo (18791916)
William Russell Flint (18801969)
Dudley Hardy (18671922)
William Hatherell (18551928)
Fortunino Matania (18811963)
J. Bernard Partridge (18611945)
Gerald Spencer Pryse (18821956)
Warwick Reynolds {18801926)
Frank Reynolds (artist) (18761953)
W. Heath Robinson (18721944)
Harry Rountree (18781950)Harry Rountree: Harry Rountree and His Work: The Art of the Illustrator (Limited Edition Prints)
Claude Allin Shepperson (18671921)
E. J. Sullivan (18691933)
Balliol Salmon (18681953)
Bert Thomas (18831966)
Frederick Henry Townsend (18681920)
Louise Wright (illustrator) (active: London 1910)
Lawson Wood (18781957)

Other books by Bradshaw
As with The Art of the Illustrator most of Bradshaw's other writing was either didactic, helping art students to learn new techniques and so on, or biographic, such as his Nice People to Know'' or the history of the Savage Club.

Faculty
Faculty (consulting staff) of the Press Art School included
Fred Pegram
W. Heath Robinson
Harry Rountree
Bert Thomas

Alumni
Students of the Press Art School included
Barry Ernest Appleby (1909–96)  
Honor C. Appleton
Mary Baker
Albert Edgar Beard
Molly Brett
Luis Chan (1904-1995)
Leo Cheney
Alan D'Egville
Phiny Dick
Fougasse Pseudonym for Cyril Kenneth Bird (18871965)
D. L. Ghilchik
Charles Grave
Joseph Booth Lee (19011974) 
Kin Maung
Norman Pett
Bertram Prance
William Ridgewell
Ralph Steadman

Notes

References

1877 births
1965 deaths
British illustrators